"The Unforgiven" is a power ballad by American heavy metal band Metallica. It was released as the second single from their eponymous fifth album Metallica (also known as The Black Album). Though one of the slower tracks on the album, its chord progression is distinctly one of the heaviest ballads featured on the album. The song deals with the theme of the struggle of the individual against the efforts of those who would subjugate him.

The song has since spawned two sequels, in the form of "The Unforgiven II", from the album Reload, and "The Unforgiven III", from the album Death Magnetic.

"The Unforgiven"

History
Lars Ulrich explained that the band wanted to try something new with the idea of a ballad. Instead of the standard melodic verse and heavy chorus – as evidenced on their previous ballads "Fade to Black", "Welcome Home (Sanitarium)" and "One" – the band opted to reverse the dynamic, with heavy, distorted verses and a softer, melodic chorus, played with undistorted electric and acoustic guitars. The opening section contains percussive instruments performed by Ulrich, and also a small amount of keyboards.

The horn intro was essentially taken from The Unforgiven (a Western movie) and then reversed so its source would be hidden, as Hetfield later explained on the documentary Classic Albums: Metallica - Metallica.

Kirk Hammett said his solo was a last minute improvisation of "raw emotion" after the ideas he came with at the studio ended up not working. Pleased with the result, Hammett said it was the starting point of him playing less scripted solos in future songs.

Live performances
"The Unforgiven" was played live as part of Metallica's "Wherever We May Roam" and "Nowhere Else to Roam" world tours, which lasted from 1991 to 1993, in support of The Black Album. It was played again on the Madly in Anger with the World Tour in 2003 and 2004 and has been continued to be played during all of the bands' tours since.

The live version of "The Unforgiven" includes a second solo near the end of the song that the original recording did not have, although this part has rarely been played since the early 2000s.

Music video
An accompanying video was released for the song. The black-and-white video is themed around a boy born in captivity who spends his life in a windowless stone room. As the video progress, he ages into an adult and then an old man. He spends his entire life carving into the stone to create a window while occasionally grasping his one possession: a locket. It is implied that another captive lives on the other side of the stone room. The video ends with the old man finally creating a window, through which he deposits his possession. He blocks off the tunnel through which he crawled to access the cell using the square of stone he created when he made the window, then lies down to die. An 11:33 long, "theatrical" version of the video exists, featuring several minutes of introductory scenes that precede the timeline of the main portion of the video. This version was featured on The Videos 1989–2004, the band's 2006 music video compilation.

Track listing

Charts

Weekly charts

Certifications

Personnel
James Hetfield – vocals, rhythm guitar, acoustic guitar
Lars Ulrich – drums
Kirk Hammett – lead guitar
Jason Newsted – bass

"The Unforgiven II"

"The Unforgiven II" was written by James Hetfield, Lars Ulrich and Kirk Hammett and appears on the album Reload as a sequel to "The Unforgiven." Both songs have similar musical themes. The chord progression during the verses is strikingly similar to the one used in the chorus on "The Unforgiven".

"The Unforgiven II" video is similar to the first video's story, though a tunnel is substituted for the blank room shown in the first video. It begins with a shirtless boy stuck in a wall, showing the wall breaking piece by piece as the boy ages. As the video progresses, it becomes more abstract, with waves crashing on the other side of the wall and rupturing it, making the wall smaller each time.  The final scene shows the remaining piece of the wall turning into a woman, with the now older boy's hand still embedded in her back.  The boy opens his hand, allowing the woman to take the key out of his hand and allowing him to take his hand out of the wall.

"The Unforgiven II" was first performed live on December 8, 1997, at that year's Billboard Music Awards.  The song was not played in a live setting again for the next 17 years, until Metallica re-introduced it into the setlist for their 2015 European festival tours. Following its performance in Gelsenkirchen, Germany's Rock Im Revier festival, Metallica then included it in the setlists of their next three shows.

Track listings

Personnel
 James Hetfield – vocals, rhythm guitar
 Lars Ulrich – drums
 Kirk Hammett – lead guitar
 Jason Newsted – bass

Charts

Weekly charts

Year-end charts

Certifications

Release history

"The Unforgiven III"

"The Unforgiven III" appears on the album Death Magnetic, released in 2008. "The Unforgiven III" is structured similarly to "The Unforgiven", containing a heavy verse and a soft chorus, "The Unforgiven II" had the opposite by having a soft verse and a heavy chorus. The chorus of "The Unforgiven III" is missing the "What I've felt, what I've known" phrase that was included in its predecessors' choruses. "The Unforgiven III" is also missing the opening horn note, instead beginning with an acoustic piano with a horn section in the background. The chords progression during the piano intro is the same as the choruses of the previous songs. Unlike its predecessors, "The Unforgiven III" features as the seventh track on Death Magnetic, due to the band wanting "The Day That Never Comes" to be the fourth track after they returned to writing ballads. However, due to the song being the counterpart of "The Day That Never Comes", it is the fourth song from closing the album. This is the first "Unforgiven" not to be released as a single or to have a music video.

In an interview for MTV, James Hetfield said that the song is "continuation of the same storyline about sin and consequence, forgiveness and unforgiveness." Hetfield has also said that, of all parts of "The Unforgiven," this is his favorite. Robert Trujillo said "it's got a great flow and it's very dynamic. It's somehow connected to the [remaining] body music of the album."

Stephen Thomas Erlewine from AllMusic in his review of the album, described the song as having "symphonic tension". A live version was performed for the first time on April 14, 2010, in Oslo, Norway, and only played a few times afterwards with the last performance being on November 21, 2010. It was played for the first time in almost eight years in Lincoln, Nebraska, on September 6, 2018, and was next performed on the two nights of Metallica and the San Francisco Symphony's S&M2 at the Chase Center, albeit in an alternate form featuring only Hetfield and the orchestra. In 2010, it was nominated for the Grammy Award for Best Hard Rock Performance but lost to "War Machine" by AC/DC.

Chart performance

Personnel
 Metallica
James Hetfield – vocals, rhythm guitar, piano
Lars Ulrich – drums
Kirk Hammett – lead guitar
Robert Trujillo – bass

 Additional musicians 
David Campbell – orchestration

References

Metallica songs
1992 singles
Heavy metal ballads
1998 singles
1990s ballads
1991 songs
Songs written by James Hetfield
Songs written by Lars Ulrich
Songs written by Kirk Hammett
Song recordings produced by Rick Rubin
Song recordings produced by Bob Rock
The Defiled songs
Black-and-white music videos
Elektra Records singles
Number-one singles in Finland